The  is a residential building in the Sumida special ward of Tokyo, Japan. Completed in June 2006, it stands at 159 m (522 ft) tall.

See also 
 List of tallest structures in Tokyo

References

Residential buildings completed in 2006
Residential skyscrapers in Tokyo
2006 establishments in Japan